The R65 is a provincial route in Mpumalanga, South Africa that connects Ermelo with the Eswatini border at Sandlane, via Amsterdam.

Route 
The R65 begins just north-east of the Ermelo town centre, at a junction with the N17 National Route. It heads eastwards from the N17 junction for 73 kilometres to reach a junction with the R33 Route in the town of Amsterdam. The R65 continues east-north-east for 17 kilometres to reach the Sandlane Border Post, where it crosses into Eswatini and becomes the MR19 Route.

References

External links
 Routes Travel Info

65
Provincial routes in South Africa